The 2011 Campeonato Internacional de Verano, also known as Copa Bimbo for sponsoring purposes, is the third edition of the Campeonato Internacional de Verano, an exhibition international club football competition that featured two clubs from Uruguay (Nacional and Peñarol), one from Paraguay (Libertad) and one from Argentina (Vélez Sársfield). It is played in Montevideo, Uruguay at the Estadio Centenario from 14 to 16 January 2011.

Bracket

Matches

Semi-finals

Third place

Final

Man of the match:
 Leonardo Burián
Assistant referees:
 Miguel Nievas
 Carlos Pastorino
Fourth official:
 Líber Prudente

Scorers 
2 goals
 Richard Porta (Nacional)

1 goal
 Rodolfo Gamarra (Libertad)
 Alejandro Martinuccio (Peñarol)
 Sebastián Coates (Nacional)
 Gabriel Alcoba (Peñarol)
 Gastón Díaz (Vélez Sársfield)
 Iván Bella (Vélez Sársfield)
 Juan Manuel Olivera (Peñarol)
 Diego Alonso (Peñarol)
 Santiago García (Nacional)
 Víctor Aquino (Libertad)
 Ignacio Canuto (Libertad)

External links 
¡A la flauta!- espectador.com (spanish)
Detalles de la Copa Bimbo 2011- Montevideo.com (spanish)

2011
2011 in Paraguayan football
2010–11 in Uruguayan football
2010–11 in Argentine football